Przemysław Kasperkiewicz (born 1 March 1994) is a Polish racing cyclist, who most recently rode for French amateur team  in 2021.

Career

Early years

Kasperkiewicz took up cycling at a very early age and competed in track and road cycling with a local club – KTK Kalisz. He showed a lot of promise as a junior rider, winning medals and national titles on the track and taking 2nd in the international junior race, the Tour de la Région de Lódz.

Coming to the Under-23 category Kasperkiewicz moved to the Netherlands and joined the WV De Jonge Renner cycling club. He raced both in Polish and Dutch races, putting his prowess on display with 6th place in the Carpathian Couriers Race and 2nd in the National Under-23 Time Trial Championships.

Professional career
In 2014, Kasperkiewicz turned professional at the age of 19, signing a one-year deal with Czech-based continental outfit . He finished 3rd overall in the Carpathian Couriers Race and shortly afterwards took his first professional victory after a successful breakaway in stage 1 of the Peace Race U23. In June Kasperkiewicz took part in the National Championships, taking silver in the under-23 men's time trial for the second consecutive time. He did not start the under-23 road race – despite being only 20, he decided to participate in the elite race, eventually finishing 4th. Following those performances, he was selected for the Polish national team for the Tour de Pologne and the Tour de l'Avenir.

Major results

2011
 9th Overall Coupe du Président de la Ville de Grudziadz
2012
 2nd Time trial, National Junior Road Championships
 2nd Overall Tour de la Région de Lódz
 7th Overall Grand Prix Rüebliland
2013
 2nd Time trial, National Under-23 Road Championships
 6th Overall Carpathian Couriers Race
2014
 1st Stage 1 Course de la Paix U23
 National Road Championships
2nd Under-23 time trial
4th Road race
 3rd Overall Carpathian Couriers Race
 5th Tour Bohemia
2015
 9th La Côte Picarde
2016
 3rd Time trial, National Under-23 Road Championships
 5th Overall Paris–Arras Tour
1st Points classification
 5th Overall Olympia's Tour
 9th Road race, UEC European Under-23 Road Championships
2017
 An Post Rás
1st  Mountains classification
1st Stage 8
 1st Stage 5 Tour de Bretagne
 6th Rutland–Melton International CiCLE Classic
2019
 1st Stage 6 Tour du Rwanda

References

External links

1994 births
Living people
Polish male cyclists
Sportspeople from Kalisz
21st-century Polish people